Parachelys is a genus of Late Jurassic turtle from marine deposits in Bavaria, southern Germany.

The type species, P. eichstaettensis, is known only from the holotype NHMUK OR42888. It can be distinguished from other members of Eurysternidae by the characteristics of its fontanelles, anterolateral contact of vertebral I with marginal I only, and the manual phalangeal formula 2-2-3-3-3.

References 

Thalassochelydia
Prehistoric turtle genera
Kimmeridgian genera
Tithonian genera
Late Jurassic turtles
Late Jurassic reptiles of Europe
Jurassic Germany
Fossils of Germany
Fossil taxa described in 1864
Taxa named by Christian Erich Hermann von Meyer